"Taiwan, China",  "Taiwan, Province of China", and  "Taipei, China" are controversial political terms that claim Taiwan and its associated territories as a province or territory of "China".

The term "Taiwan, China" is used by Chinese state media even though the People's Republic of China (PRC) – which is widely recognized by the international community as the legitimate representative of "China" – does not exercise jurisdiction over Taiwan and other islands controlled by the Republic of China (ROC).

Such terms are ambiguous because of the political status of Taiwan and cross-Strait relations between "Taiwan" and "China". Since 1949, two political entities with the name "China" exist:
 The People's Republic of China (PRC) known today as "China" or "Mainland China", historically known as "Communist China", "Maoist China", "Red China", "Soviet Zone" or the "Chinese Soviet Republic".
 The Republic of China (ROC) known today as "Taiwan" or the "Free area of the Republic of China", historically known as "China", "Formosa", "Nationalist China", and "Free China".

The Chinese Communist Party (CCP) officially sanctions the use of these terms.  In contrast, the ROC government, along with supporters of Taiwan Independence, rejects them; citing that it denies the ROC's sovereignty and existence, while reducing both its political and territorial status to a province of mainland China.

Ambiguity over "China" 

The dispute and ambiguity over the meaning of "China" and which "China" stemmed from the division of Republic of China into two Chinas at the "end" of the Chinese Civil War in 1955. (Fighting between the two merely eased off after 1949 and no signing of a peace treaty or armistice ever occurred; the PRC still threatens attack on ROC/Taiwan when it deems necessary.) The term "China" historically meant the various regimes and imperial dynasties which controlled territories in mainland Asia prior to 1911, when the imperial system was overthrown and the Republic of China (ROC) was established as the first republic in Asia. In 1927, the Chinese Civil War started between the Kuomintang (KMT, founding party of the ROC) and the CCP. The CCP eventually won control of most of ROC's original territory (mainland China) in 1949, when they proclaimed the "People's Republic of China" (PRC) on that territory.

Since then, two Chinas have existed, although the PRC was not internationally recognized at the time. The Republic of China government retrieved Taiwan in 1945 back from Japan, then fled in 1949 to Taiwan with the aim to retake mainland China. Both the ROC and the PRC still officially (constitutionally) claim mainland China and the Taiwan Area as part of their respective territories. In reality, the PRC rules only Mainland China and has no control of but claims Taiwan as part of its territory under its "One China Principle". The ROC, which rules only the Taiwan Area (composed of Taiwan and its nearby minor islands), became known as "Taiwan" after its largest island, (an instance of pars pro toto). Constitutional reform in 1991 amended electoral laws to focus on the territory controlled by the Republic of China, increasingly referred to as "the Republic of China on Taiwan" or simply "Taiwan" .

After the 2008 election of Ma Ying-jeou, he again asserted that mainland China is part of Republic of China territory according to its constitution, and, in 2013, he stated that relations between PRC and ROC are not between countries but "regions of the same country".

In 1971, the People's Republic of China won the United Nations seat as "China" and the ROC withdrew from the UN. Since then the term "Taiwan, China" is a designation officially used in international organizations including the United Nations and its associated organs to refer to the Republic of China.  (The term "Chinese Taipei" was similarly created for the same purpose. ) However, the political status of Taiwan is a complex and controversial issue and currently unresolved , in large part due to the United States and the Allies of World War II handling of the surrender of Taiwan from Japan in 1945  (which was to be a temporary administration by the ROC troops), and the Treaty of Peace with Japan ("Treaty of San Francisco") in 1951, for which neither the ROC nor the PRC was invited, and left Taiwan's sovereignty legally undefined in international law and in dispute .

Ambiguity of "Province of Taiwan" 

The term "Taiwan, (Province of) China" is also potentially ambiguous because both the ROC and the PRC each has administratively a "Taiwan Province", Taiwan Province, Republic of China and "Taiwan Province, People's Republic of China", and neither of these provinces covers the Matsu Islands, Wuchiu, Kinmen, all of which have been retained by the Republic of China. Geographically speaking, they both refer to the same place. Without more specific indication, it is unclear to which "Taiwan Province" is being referred. However, since China (PRC) has never had sovereignty over Taiwan and its "Taiwan Province" exists only as a claim, as a practical matter, "Taiwan Province" refers only to the Taiwan Province under Republic of China's administration.

Although the word "China" could also possibly be interpreted to mean "Republic of China", this interpretation is no longer common since "China" is typically understood as referring to the PRC after the ROC lost its UN seat as "China" in 1971, and is considered a term distinct from "Taiwan", the name with which the ROC has become identified. Also, only the ROC's Taiwan Province exists in reality and is under the ROC's actual territorial control, whereas the PRC's "Taiwan Province" exists only on paper, under the PRC's administrative structure but without an actual provincial government. Instead, the PRC has a Taiwan Affairs Office of the State Council to deal with issues and policy guidelines relating to Taiwan.

The ROC also does not refer to its Taiwan Province as "Taiwan, China" in English but rather as "Taiwan Province, Republic of China", and typically such reference only occurs in the Chinese language in the ROC's official documents and as the marquee in the administrative offices of Taiwan Province government. However, references to the province is now rare since the Taiwan Provincial Government has largely been dissolved and its functions transferred to the central government or county governments since 1997. Therefore, recent uses of the term "Taiwan, Province of China" appears mainly in PRC-controlled media like CCTV (Chinese Central Television) and in the ISO 3166-1 codes.

Taipei, China 

The term "Taipei, China", sometimes also translated as "China Taipei", is the PRC's unilaterally preferred Chinese translation for the English term "Chinese Taipei". It is one of the PRC's officially endorsed terms when referring to Taiwan politically, and has been used in state media in much the same manner as "Taiwan, China" or "Taiwan, Province of China".

Objection claims

The Republic of China (Taiwan) government 
The Republic of China (ROC) is not allowed to use  its official name internationally and uses "Chinese Taipei" in other organizations like the Olympics. The ROC sees its use as a denial of the ROC's status as a separate sovereign state, diminishing it under "China", which implicitly is the PRC. 

In an incident on 10 May 2011, the World Health Organization referred to Taiwan as "Taiwan, China" in its documents. (The ROC participates in the WHO under the name "Chinese Taipei") ROC president Ma Ying-jeou protested the WHO's action and accused the PRC of "pressuring the UN body into calling" the ROC "Chinese territory", and stated that Beijing's moves were "very negative" for bilateral ties.

Taiwan Independence Supporters 

The confusion and fight over use of the "China" name and the lack of name recognition of "Republic of China" itself and recognition as a country are part of the reason for the supporters of Taiwan independence to push for an identity apart from "China" and for renaming the ROC and gaining international recognition as "Republic of Taiwan". Some supporters also reject the legitimacy of Republic of China's takeover of Taiwan from Japan at the end of World War II since 1945 (due to the lack of transfer of sovereignty in the Treaty of Peace with Japan). They also view that Taiwan is no longer part of China since "China" is recognized by the UN as being the People's Republic of China (PRC) rather than the ROC/Taiwan, so placing "Taiwan" and "China" together in one term is incorrect.

Usage

The United Nations and the ISO 
The Chinese and Taiwanese entries in the International Organization for Standardization's ISO 3166-1 country codes and ISO 3166-2:TW subdivision codes are as follows because its information source, the publication UN Terminology Bulletin-Country Names, lists Taiwan as "Taiwan, Province of China" due to the PRC's political influence in the United Nations as a member of the UN Security Council. Since the ISO 3166-1 code is commonly used as the data source for a complete list of country and territory names for computer programs and websites, "Taiwan, Province of China" is sometimes seen on dropdown menus instead of "Taiwan" for this reason.

Taiwanese reactions
In 2007, the Republic of China filed a lawsuit before a Swiss civil court against the ISO, arguing that the ISO's use of the United Nations name rather than "Republic of China (Taiwan)" violated Taiwan's name rights. On 9 September 2010, a panel of the Federal Supreme Court of Switzerland decided, by three votes to two, to dismiss the suit as presenting a political question not subject to Swiss civil jurisdiction. As of 2009, the Chinese and Taiwanese entries in CNS 12842 based on ISO 3166 with some differences are as follows with 11 columns meaning:
English short name upper case
Chinese name
English full name
Alpha-2 code
Alpha-3 code
Numeric code
Remark
Independent
Administrative language alpha-2
Administrative language alpha-3
Local short name

The Taipei-based government of the Republic of China encodes the subdivisions of Taiwan with some systems different from ISO 3166-2:TW:
A national identification card has a unique number prefixed by an alphabet for a city or county.
The three-digit postal codes in Taiwan usually encode townships and the equivalents.
The national Code of Household Registration and Conscription Information System (HRCIS Code) covers more than Taiwanese subdivisions.

People's Republic of China 
The term is often used in Chinese media whenever the word "Taiwan" is mentioned, as in news reports and in TV shows. Particularly, when Taiwanese entertainers are on talk shows or being interviewed, the Chinese subtitles on the TV screen would always say "Taiwan, China" ( / ) despite the fact the person never mentioned the word "China" ( / ). (It is standard practice for Chinese television to display subtitles in all programs.) Also, there has been controversy about Chinese talent shows forcing Taiwanese contestants to introduce themselves as from "Taiwan, China" or "Taipei, China". For example, Taiwanese singer  introduced herself as being from "Pingtung District, Taipei, China" ( /) on her first appearance on The Voice of China in 2013, despite Pingtung and Taipei being completely distinct areas on opposite sides of Taiwan, causing an uproar among Taiwanese netizens. Her response was that she was instructed to say so by the directors and was nervous.

In a reversal of this tendency, in July 2017 the PRC's state news agency Xinhua issued a style guide stating that for geographical references, the region should be named "Taiwan Area" or "Taiwan" and that it was 'generally now not called' "Taiwan Province". Its reason for doing so was ostensibly to "[take] into account the psychological feelings of Taiwanese." However, the same style guide stated that for any political references, all three of "Taiwan", "Taipei", and "Chinese Taipei" were prohibited in favor of the PRC's preferred "Taiwan, China" or "Taipei, China". (The PRC only permits the term "Chinese Taipei" in the context of international organizations, such as the IOC and the WTO.) In addition, it stated that for the use case of publishing maps or statistics that include the mainland but exclude Taiwan to depict the People's Republic of China solely, any disclaimer should be explicitly labeled "Taiwan Province not included" with the word "province".

United States 
If a place of birth on a United States passport application is written as "Taiwan, China", which cannot be shown in passports as per the One-China policy, the United States Department of State requires its officials to contact the applicant to ascertain whether "Taiwan" or "China" is the preferred place of birth to be printed.

Vietnam 
The term  ("Taiwan Province") sometimes appear in media to refer to all of "Taiwan Area" (not only referring to the Taiwan Province of ROC). "Đài Loan" remains the official name of Taiwan in Vietnamese in most cases.

International airlines
In April 2018, the Civil Aviation Administration of China (CAAC) wrote a letter to approximately 36 airlines throughout the world, including American Airlines, Air Canada, All Nippon Airways, Air New Zealand, British Airways, Delta Airlines, Japan Airlines, Lufthansa,  Qantas, Singapore Airlines, and United Airlines, among others, requesting that they change travel destination cities in Taiwan on their websites to list them under "Taiwan, Province of China", or directly list them as, for example, "Taipei, China" and "Kaohsiung, China" instead of the existing "Taipei, Taiwan" and "Kaohsiung, Taiwan". The request was made under the possibility that if the demands were not met, the airlines could be banned from flying into China or along its airspace.

Most airlines quickly complied, although there were some initial resistance among some U.S. airlines. They requested a time extension to consider the issue, and replied to the Authority that they will confer with the U.S. government regarding the course of action. The White House under the Trump administration responded  by labeling the move as "Orwellian nonsense". The CAAC therefore extended the deadline for U.S. airlines to 25 July 2018 for compliance. Eventually, all of the resisting U.S. airlines partially gave in to Beijing's demand by the deadline, and dropped all references to Taiwan as a country, but rather listing the city names only (for example, just "Taipei" or "Kaohsiung" without any mention of which country the city is in).

See also 

 Cross-Strait relations
 Index of Taiwan-related articles
 Outline of Taiwan
 Political status of Taiwan
 Taiwan independence movement
 United Nations General Assembly Resolution 2758

Notes

References 

Politics of China
Politics of Taiwan
Cross-Strait relations
Geographical naming disputes